TTFF may refer to:

 Time to first fix, a specification detailing the time required for a GPS receiver to acquire a position
 Trinidad and Tobago Football Federation, the governing body of Association football in Trinidad and Tobago
 Through the Fire and Flames, a hit single by DragonForce